Troides magellanus, the Magellan birdwing, is a large and striking birdwing butterfly found in the Philippines and on Taiwan's Orchid Island.

This butterfly is named for the explorer Ferdinand Magellan who was killed in the Philippines in 1521.

Description

Male: The forewings are ground colour black. The veins are bordered by white. The underside of the forewings is very similar to the upperside, but some veins are bordered by yellow. The hindwings are golden yellow. The veins and the marginal edge of the hindwing are black. The golden area has an opal, green or blue colour at a certain angle. The underside of the hindwing is very similar to the upperside and also has the optical effect.

The body (abdomen) is yellowish, but the underside is yellow. Head and thorax are black.

Female: is sexually dimorphic. The female is larger than the male. The ground colour of the female is dark brown to black. The veins are bordered by white colour shading. There is a golden area with dark veins on the hindwings. At the edge there is a postdiscal chain of golden spots. The underside is very similar to the upperside.

Iridescence
T. magellanus shows a blue-green sheen if viewed from an oblique angle. Troides magellanus and the much rarer T. prattorum, are noted for their use of limited-view iridescence: the yellow of the dorsal hindwings is modified by bright blue-green iridescence which is only seen when the butterfly is viewed at a narrow, oblique angle. This "grazing iridescence" is brought about through diffraction of light (after back reflection) by the wings' extremely steeply set, multilayered rib-like scales (rather than the ridge-lamellae of most other iridescent butterflies, such as Morpho species). Such limited-view iridescence was previously only known from one other species, the lycaenid Ancyluris meliboeus. In A. meliboeus, however, the iridescence is produced by ridge-lamellar scales and features a wider range of colours.

Distribution
Philippines Batan Island, Babuyan Island, Luzon, Polillo, Marinduque, Cuyo Island, Samar, Cebu, Leyte, Bohol and Mindanao.

Taiwan Orchid Island only.

Biology
Larvae feed on species of Aristolochia - A. acuminata, A. debilis, A. kankauensis, A. tagala and A. zollingeriana

Subspecies
Troides magellanus magellanus Philippines
Troides magellanus sonani (Matsumura, 1931) 65 km south-east of Taïwan on Orchid Island

Forma

Troides magellanus f. apoensis Okano & Ohkura, 1978
Troides magellanus f. leyteanus Okano & Ohkura, 1983

Related species
Troides magellanus is a member of the Troides aecus species group. The members of this clade are:

Troides aeacus C. & R. Felder, 1860
Troides magellanus (C. & R. Felder, 1862)
Troides minos (Cramer, [1779])
Troides rhadamantus (Lucas, 1835)
Troides dohertyi (Rippon, 1893)
Troides prattorum (Joicey & Talbot, 1922)

See also
Ecoregions in the Philippines

References

Haugum, J. and Low, A.M. (1985) A Monograph of the Birdwing Butterflies. Scandinavian Science Press, Klampenborg. 
Jumalon, Julian N. (1966) Notes on two Philippine Birdwings (Troides magellanus and Trogonoptera trojana) Philippine Scientist 1966:13-21.

D'Abrera, B. (1975) Birdwing Butterflies of the World. Country Life Books, London.
Okano, Masao; & Ohkura, Jozaburo, 1978 The geographical races of Troides magellanus (C. & R. Felder). Artes Liberales 23:173-175
Kurt Rumbucher; Béla von Knötgen, 1999 Part.6, Papilionidae. 3, Troides. 1 aeacus- group in Erich Bauer and Thomas Frankenbach Eds. Butterflies of the World Keltern: Goecke & Evers 1999.

External links
Troides magellanus at Ngypal
Butterflycorner.net Images from Naturhistorisches Museum Wien (English/German)
Mindanao montane rain forests

Magellanus
Butterflies of Asia
Lepidoptera of the Philippines
Insects of Taiwan
Butterflies described in 1862